is a Japanese rugby sevens player. She competed in the 2016 Summer Olympics for the Japanese women's rugby sevens team. She was also part of the squad that won a silver medal at the 2014 Asian Games in Incheon, South Korea.

References

External links 
 
 Japan Player Profile

1982 births
Living people
People from Ichinomiya, Aichi
Olympic rugby sevens players of Japan
Japanese rugby sevens players
Japan international women's rugby sevens players
Rugby sevens players at the 2016 Summer Olympics
Sportspeople from Aichi Prefecture
Asian Games silver medalists for Japan
Medalists at the 2014 Asian Games
Asian Games medalists in rugby union
Rugby union players at the 2014 Asian Games
Aichi University of Education alumni